Behind the Gardens - Behind the Wall - Under the Tree . . . . is a studio album by new-age artist Andreas Vollenweider, released in 1981. It is almost entirely instrumental, and centers on Vollenweider on harp.

History
While not Vollenweider's first album, Behind the Gardens is often regarded as such because it was his first album to receive wide recognition. The earlier and more obscure Eine Art Suite in XIII Teilen (A sort of Suite in 13 Parts), 1979, is now mainly available online, while Behind the Gardens is still on sale in music stores.

The second track, "Pyramid", is a favorite among fans and has become a concert staple.

In 1990 the album was re-released as a two-CD set with the two following albums, Caverna Magica and White Winds, entitled Trilogy. The full titles of the first two albums indicate that the three albums are thematically connected; the full title of the next album is Caverna Magica (...Under the Tree - In the Cave...). Vollenweider has said that the title of the album is meant to be directions: "You will find us behind The Garden, behind The Wall, under The Tree...".

Track listing

Personnel
Personnel on the original "Behind the Gardens":
 Andreas Vollenweider - Harp, Guitars, Saxophone, Synthesizers
 Walter Keiser - Drums
 Jon Otis, Pedro Haldemann - Percussion

References

External links 
 Official Andreas Vollenweider Site
 Official Walter Keiser Site
 Official Jon Otis Site

1981 albums
Andreas Vollenweider albums
Columbia Records albums